William Singleton (died 1677) was an English politician who sat in the House of Commons  in 1640. He fought briefly on the side of the Parliamentarians in the English Civil War.

Singleton may have been the son of Thomas Singleton, merchant of London and Gloucester. He was a draper. He was Sheriff of Gloucester in 1618. He was elected as an alderman in 1635  and became Mayor of Gloucester in 1637.

In April 1640, Singleton was elected Member of Parliament for Gloucester in the Short Parliament. He was a captain in the regiment of Colonel Henry Stephens in the defence of Goucester in 1643. He was Mayor of Gloucester again in 1651.
 
Singleton married Martha Lane, daughter of William Lane of Gloucester at St Nicholas Church on 21 June 1624.

References

Year of birth missing
1677 deaths
Mayors of Gloucester
English MPs 1640 (April)
Members of the Parliament of England (pre-1707) for Gloucester
Roundheads